Pangkalan Bun  is the capital of West Kotawaringin Regency in Borneo, Indonesia. It has a population of around 200,000 It is also the administrative headquarters of South Arut (Arut Selatan) district (kecamatan).

Pangkalan Bun is served by Iskandar Airport.  Several airlines fly to this airport. Shipping services provide connections to Jakarta, Surabaya, and Semarang.

The site has expanded from the original hut in 1971. Its facilities, supported by the Orangutan Foundation International, are a part of the Tanjung Puting National Park.

Crash of AirAsia QZ 8501

Iskandar International Airport was one of the operation centres being used to support search operations following the crash of AirAsia QZ 8501 on 28 December 2014 in nearby Karimata Strait. Shortly after the crash, the Indonesian National Search and Rescue Agency (BASARNAS, or Badan SAR Nasional) established a post in Iskandar airport to coordinate the search. The head of the agency, Air Marshal Bambang Sulistyo, took close personal command of operations.

Following confirmation of the crash, Indonesian agencies prepared over 160 coffins in Pangkalan Bun so as to be ready, in accordance with Indonesian practice, to take care of those who died as quickly as possible.  After reception in Pangkalan Bun, the plan was to return the bodies of the people who died to their families, mostly in Surabaya in East Java where Flight QZ 8501 originated from.

Geography

Climate
Pangkalan Bun has a tropical rainforest climate (Af) with heavy rainfall year-round.

References

Regency seats of Central Kalimantan
West Kotawaringin Regency